Ellen Hansell defeated Laura Knight 6–1, 6–0 in the final to win the inaugural event of the women's singles tennis title at the 1887 U.S. National Championships. It was played on outdoor grass courts and held from September 27 through October 5, 1887 at the Philadelphia Cricket Club in Wissahickon, Philadelphia.

Draw

References

1887 in tennis
1887
1887 in women's tennis
1887 in American women's sports
Women's singles)
Women's sports in Pennsylvania
History of Philadelphia
1887 in Pennsylvania